Peru national under-15 football team, also known as Peru Under-15, represents Peru in association football, at an under-15 age level and is controlled by the Peruvian Football Federation, the governing body for football in Peru.

South American Under-15 Football Championship Record

Summer Youth Olympic Football Tournament Record

Honours
South American Under-15 Football Championship
Winners (1): 2013

Youth Olympic Games
Winners (1): 2014

under-15
South American national under-15 association football teams